berb

A list of films produced in France in 1969.

See also 
 1969 in France
 1969 in French television

References

External links 
 French films of 1969 at the Internet Movie Database
French films of 1969 at Cinema-francais.fr

1969
Films
French